Guillermo Carlos Bazan is an American chemist, material scientist, and academic.

Bazan earned a B.Sc with Honors in chemistry from the University of Ottawa in 1986, and a Ph.D in Inorganic Chemistry from Massachusetts Institute of Technology in 1991.  From 1992 to 1998 he was on the faculty of the University of Rochester. In 1998 he was appointed as a professor in the Chemistry & Biochemistry Department and the Materials Department at the University of California, Santa Barbara. In January 2020, he took a position at the National University of Singapore.

Bazan has over 670 publications, an h-index of 120, and his work has been recognized by the Arthur C. Cope Scholar Award of the American Chemical Society (2007) and the Bessel Award of the Humboldt Foundation.  He is a fellow of the American Association for the Advancement of Science.

Publications and Patents

Synthesis, Morphology and Optical Properties of Tetrahedral Oligo(phenylenevinylene) Materials, Wang, S.; Oldham, W.J.; Hudack, R.A.; Bazan, G.C., J. Am. Chem. Soc., 2000, 122, 5695-5709.  
DNA Detection using Water-Soluble Conjugated Polymers and Peptide Nucleic Acid Probes, Gaylord, B.S.; Heeger, A.J.; Bazan, G.C., Proc. Natl. Acad. Sci. USA, 2002, 99, 10954-10957.
Fluorescein Provides a Resonance Gate for FRET from Conjugated Polymers to DNA Intercalated Dyes, Wang, S.; Gaylord, B.S.; Bazan, G.C., J. Am. Chem. Soc., 2004, 126, 5446-5451.
Methods and compositions for detection and analysis of polynucleotides using light harvesting multichromophores, US Patent 7,214,489, May 8, 2007.
Novel Organic Materials through Control of Multichromophore Interactions, Bazan, G.C., J. Org. Chem., 2007, 72, 8615-8635.
"Plastic" Solar Cells: Self-Assembly of Bulk Heterojunction Nanomaterials by Spontaneous Phase Separation, Peet, J.; Heeger, A.J.; Bazan, G.C., Acc. Chem. Res., 2009, 42, 1700–1708.
Streamlined Microwave-Assisted Preparation of Narrow-Bandgap Conjugated Polymers for High-Performance Bulk Heterojunction Solar Cells, Coffin, R.C.; Peet, J.; Rogers, J.; Bazan, G.C., Nature Chemistry, 2009, 1, 657-661.
Chemically Fixed p-n Heterojunctions for Polymer Electronics by means of Covalent B-F Bond Formation, Hoven, C.V.; Wang, H.P.; Elbing, M.; Garner, L.E.; Winkelhaus, D.; Bazan, G.C., Nature Materials, 2010, 9, 249-252.
Electrochemical Considerations for Determining Absolute Frontier Orbital Energy Levels of Conjugated Polymers for Solar Cell Applications, Cardona, C.M; Li, W.; Kaifer, A.E.;  Stockdale, D.;  Bazan, G.C.,  Adv. Mater., 2011, 23, 2367-2371.
Non-Basic High-Performance Molecules for Solution-Processed Organic Solar Cells, van der Poll, T.S.; Love, J.A.; Nguyen, T.Q.; Bazan, G.C., Adv. Mater., 2012, 24, 3646-3649.
Design Strategies for Organic Semiconductors Beyond the Molecular Formula; Henson, Z.B.; Mullen, K.; Bazan, G.C., Nature Chemistry., 2012, 4, 699-704.
Design and Synthesis of Molecular Donors for Solution-Processed High-Efficiency Organic Solar Cells, Coughlin, J.E.; Henson, Z.B.; Welch, G.C.; Bazan, G.C., Acc. Chem. Res., 2014, 47, 257-270.

Awards and Recognitions
Fellow of the Royal Society of Chemistry, 2014
Top 50 Material Scientists by Citation and Impact, Thomson Reuters, 2011 
Professor of the Chang Jiang Scholars Professor, 2009
Advanced Materials Editorial Advisory Board, 2008 
Fellow of the American Association for the Advancement of Science, 2007 
American Chemical Society Cope Scholar Award, 2007
Bessel Award, Humboldt Foundation, 2005 
National Science Foundation Special Creativity Award, 2003 
Union Carbide Innovation Award, 1999
Union Carbide Innovation Award, 1998		
Closs Lecturer, University of Chicago, 1997  
Camille and Henry Dreyfus Foundation Teacher-Scholar Award, 1996-1998 
Sloan Research Fellow Award, 1996-1998
National Science Foundation CAREER Award, 1995-1998
Camille and Henry Dreyfus Foundation New Faculty Award, 1992-1993 
Natural Sciences and Engineering Research Council of Canada Postdoctoral Fellowship, November 1990-May 1992	
Natural Sciences and Engineering Research Council of Canada 1967 Science and Engineering Scholarship, September 1986-June 1990

References

External links
Bazan Research Group website at the University of California, Santa Barbara.
Curriculum Vitae of Guillermo C. Bazan Retrieved November 13, 2012.

See also
 Alan J. Heeger

21st-century American chemists
Living people
Molecular electronics
Organic semiconductors
Polymer scientists and engineers
University of Ottawa alumni
Massachusetts Institute of Technology School of Science alumni
University of California, Santa Barbara faculty
Year of birth missing (living people)